Bluff Master is a Bollywood drama movie released in 1963 directed by Manmohan Desai starring Shammi Kapoor, Saira Banu, Pran, and Lalita Pawar.

Plot
Ashok (Shammi Kapoor) is on the lookout for a job. But that does not stop him from putting on airs and bluffing, pretending that he is from a rich family. As luck would have it, he gets the job of a photographer for a fictitious tabloid - Bhukump, only to lose it, because he had the misfortune to click the photograph of the owner's daughter Seema (Saira Banu) slapping an eve teaser.

Never one to give up, he somehow meets her and convinces her of his good intentions. When she falls in love with him, Ashok tries to give up bluffing. But it is too late as no one believes him now.

Cast
 Shammi Kapoor as Ashok Azad
 Saira Banu as Seema
 Pran as Mr. Kumar
 Lalita Pawar as Ashok's mother
 Mohan Choti

Soundtrack

References

External links

1960s Hindi-language films
1963 films
Films scored by Kalyanji Anandji
Films directed by Manmohan Desai
Indian comedy-drama films